Korle-Bu Teaching Hospital (KBTH) is a public teaching hospital located in the  Ablekuma South Metropolitan District in Accra, Ghana. It is the only public tertiary hospital in the southern part of the country. It is a teaching hospital affiliated with the medical school of the University of Ghana. Three centres of excellence, the National Cardiothoracic Centre, the National Plastic and Reconstructive Surgery and the Radiotherapy Centres are all part of it. In 2019, the hospital gained a license from the Health Facilities Regulatory Agency (HeFRA), after meeting the requirement.

Established on 9 October 1923, Korle-Bu Teaching Hospital has grown from an initial 200-bed capacity to 2,000. It is currently the third largest hospital in Africa and the leading national referral centre in Ghana.

Korle-Bu, which means the valley of the Korle Lagoon, was established as a general hospital to address the health needs of the indigenous people under the administration of Sir Gordon Guggisberg, then Governor of the Gold Coast.

Population growth and the proven efficacy of hospital-based treatment caused a rise in hospital attendance in Korle-Bu. By 1953, demand for the hospital's services had escalated so high that the government was compelled to set up a task force to study the situation and make recommendations for the expansion of the hospital.

The government accepted and implemented the recommendations of the task force which resulted in the construction of new structures, such as the Maternity, Medical, Surgical and Child Health Blocks. This increased the hospital's bed capacity to 1,200.

Korle-Bu gained teaching hospital status in 1962, when the University of Ghana Medical School (UGMS) was established for the training of medical doctors.

The UGMS and five other constituent schools are now subsumed under the College of Health Sciences to train an array of health professionals. All the institutions of the college however, undertake their clinical training and research in the hospital.

The hospital currently has 2,000 beds and 17 clinical and diagnostic Departments/Units. It has an average daily attendance of 1,500 patients and about 250 patient admissions.

Clinical and diagnostic departments of the hospital include Medicine, Child Health, Obstetrics and Gynaecology, Pathology, Laboratories, Radiology, Anaesthesia, Surgery, Polyclinic, Accident Centre and the Surgical/Medical Emergency as well as Pharmacy. Other departments include Pharmacy, Finance, Engineering, General Administration.

The hospital also provides specialisation in various fields such as Neuro-surgery, Dentistry, Eye, ENT, Renal, Orthopaedics, Oncology, Dermatology, Cardiothoracic, Radiotherapy, Radio diagnosis, Paediatric Surgery and Reconstructive Plastic Surgery and Burns.

The Reconstructive Plastic Surgery and Burn Centre, the National Cardiothoracic Centre and the National Centre for Radiotherapy and Nuclear Medicine in particular also draw a sizeable number of their clientele from neighbouring countries such as Nigeria, Burkina Faso and Togo.

Korle-Bu Teaching Hospital recently carried out the first ever kidney transplant in Ghana. It is one of the few hospitals in Africa where DNA tests are carried out. Other specialised services the hospital provides include brachytherapy intervention for the treatment of prostate cancer and keyhole surgeries.

Plans are underway to venture into molecular testing. All these are part of the grand plan to offer a wider spectrum of specialist care to position Ghana as the hub of health tourism within the West Africa Sub region.

Institutions 
The hospital has a very large campus and has expanded to host a number of institutions. The list includes the following:
 University of Ghana Medical School
 University of Ghana Dental School
 University of Ghana School of Biomedical and Allied Health Sciences
 Nurses Training College
 Midwifery Training School
 Ghana Medical Association
 Ghana Association of Medical Laboratory Scientists
 School of Hygiene(Preventive medicine)
 School of Radiology
 school of Peri-operative and critical care nursing
 Ophthalmic Nursing school

National Cardio-Thoracic Centre 

 The Facility is known as one of the best State of the Art Centre for Cardio-Thoracic Care in West Africa
 The whole project was carried out by Hospital Engineering GmbH and GerTech GmbH from Germany
 It was carried out as a Turn-Key Project, including planning, designing, project development, construction works and implementation as well as provision and installation of medical and technical equipment
 Since there is a high demand both from local and foreign patients the existing Centre is not sufficient, recent media publications are calling for an extension

Centres of Excellence 
 National Cardiothoracic Centre
 National Plastic and Reconstructive Surgery
 Radiotherapy Centre

Korle-Bu Neuroscience Foundation
The Korle-Bu Neuroscience Foundation (KBNF) is a project in aid of the Korle-Bu Teaching Hospital. It was founded by Marjorie Ratel, a nurse of neuroscience in Vancouver, British Columbia, Canada. The KBNF was involved in the foundation of the Korle-Bu Neuroscience Center.

See also 
 Komfo Anokye Teaching Hospital
 List of hospitals in Ghana

References

External links
 Biography of Gordon Guggisberg
Korle-Bu Neuroscience Foundation
 University of Ghana Medical Laboratory Science Students Association (UG-MELSSA)

Hospital buildings completed in 1923
Hospitals in Ghana
Greater Accra Region
Hospitals established in 1923
1923 establishments in Gold Coast (British colony)